Cjamango is a 1967 Italian Spaghetti Western starring Ivan Rassimov billed as Sean Todd. The film was officially released in Germany as Django Kreuze im Blutigen Sand, as another unofficial sequel to the 1966 film Django. The film May God Forgive You... But I Won't (1968) features George Ardisson as Cjamango McDonald.

Plot
After winning gold in a poker game, Cjamango only has it stolen by his partners. Cjamango sets out for revenge.

Cast

 Sean Todd: Cjamango
 Hélène Chanel: Perla Hernandez
 Mickey Hargitay: Clinton
 Livio Lorenzon: Don Pablo
 Piero Lulli: El Tigre
 Giusva Fioravanti: Manuel Hernandez
 Ignazio Spalla: Mexikanischer Spieler 
 Gino Buzzanca: Hernandez

Releases
Wild East released the film on a limited edition Region 1 DVD in 2007.

References

External links

1967 films
1960s Italian-language films
Films directed by Edoardo Mulargia
Spaghetti Western films
1967 Western (genre) films
1960s Italian films